Tiptur Ramaraju Narasimharaju (24 July 1923 – 11 July 1979) was an Indian actor in Kannada cinema who specialised in roles that required ample comic timing. He was the comedy stalwart of the Kannada film industry. He acted in more than 250 Kannada films between 1954 and 1979. He was also referred to as Hasya Chakravarti.

Career

Theatre
Narasimharaju's stage debut happened when he was 4 years old. The poverty prevailing in the house made his uncle Lakshmipathiraju take the young lad to the 'Chandramouleshwara Drama Company' run by C. B. Mallappa who happened to be touring Tiptur during that period. He played the roles of Prahlada, Lohithaswa, Krishna, Markanda among others. After some time, Narasimharaju left that company and formed his own troupe and enacted his roles from his now previous performances –  Gora-Kumbara, and Harischandra. He soon joined "Edathorey Drama Company" after his troupe sustained losses. He took on the garb of a lady in the mythological Vishvamitra, Rama, Ravana, and Bharata among others. He spent the first 27 years of his acting career in professional drama companies. He donned different roles in the plays of different companies like "Shri Chandramauleshwara Nataka Sabha", "Hirannaiah Mitra Mandali", "Bharatha Lalitha Kala Sangha", "Gunda Joisara Company" of Belur, and Gubbi "Channabasaveshwara Nataka Company". He did not neglect these drama companies even after becoming hugely popular as a film actor.

Films
He made his film debut in 1954 when he acted in the film Bedara Kannappa alongside Rajkumar in the role of the son of the temple priest. Both were colleagues from the time they were in Gubbi Veeranna's drama company. Narasimharaju took inspiration from Charlie Chaplin. He is referred to by some as one of the greatest comedians of his time. It is also said that people would not have watched Kannada films in the 1960s if he did not star in them. 
 
Though known for his comic timing, Narasmimharaju unfortunately spent his last days mourning the death of his son in an accident. He died aged 56 on 11 July 1979 at around 4.30 a.m. due to severe heart attack.  After his death, an annual cine award, the  Narasimharaju Prashasti was established in his memory. He was the busiest actor in the Kannada film industry, even actors like Rajkumar used to wait for his callsheet, and used to adjust to his dates. However, despite his iconic status among Kannadigas, it is ironic that he was not awarded even once either by the state or the central governments.

A comedian by profession, Narasimharaju was a family man and knew what he had to do for his family. Narasimharaju intelligently invested his earnings into building houses in the then Madras city and Bangalore. In fact, he was the first Kannada actor to own a house in Madras, even before the matinee idol Rajkumar and is even credited to have completed 100 films before Dr Rajkumar through the 1967 film, Nakkare ade swarga

Filmography

Sources

References

University of Pennsylvania 
Search string: narasimha raju

External links

Indian male comedians
Male actors in Kannada cinema
Indian male film actors
People from Tumkur
Kannada people
1923 births
1979 deaths
20th-century Indian male actors
Male actors from Karnataka
20th-century comedians